Naqaab is a 2018 Indian Bengali-language supernatural action comedy film directed by Rajiv Kumar Biswas. The film is produced by Shrikant Mohta and Mahendra Soni under the banner of SVF Entertainment. It stars Bangladeshi Superstar Shakib Khan, Nusrat Jahan and Sayantika Banerjee and also features Rudranil Ghosh, Bharat Kaul,  Sudip Mukherjee  , Supriyo Dutta,  Rebeka Rouf , Kharaj Mukherjee, and Shiba Shanu in supporting roles. The movie is a remake of the 2015 Tamil film Massu Engira Masilamani.

Plot
A thief named Masss meets with a car accident while trying to flee a crime scene. After the incident, he claims that he can see ghosts and starts tricking people.

Cast
 Shakib Khan as Mass/Indrajit Chatterjee, Masss's Father (Dual Role)
 Nusrat Jahan as Disha, Mass's lover
 Sayantika Banerjee as Anuradha, Indrajit's wife & Masss's mother
 Rudranil Ghosh as Rahim, Masss's best friend
 Sudip Mukherjee as Police  Officer, West Bengal Police
 Kharaj Mukherjee as a doctor
 Bharat Kaul as R.K. the main antagonist, the leader of black money trail
 Supriyo Dutta as MLA Ratan Sardar
 Shiba Shanu
 Debraj Mukherjee
 Rebeka Rouf
 Nigel Akkara as Javed Sheikh, Indrajit's family friend
 Raja Dutta as Shaiful Bhai, who exports and imports illegal arms in the docks area
 Soma Banerjee
 Kamal Patekar
 Rohit Mukherjee

Soundtrack
The soundtrack of Naqaab is composed by Dev Sen and lyrics are written by Prasen (Prasenjit Mukherjee). There are four songs in the film. SVF will promote the music on their YouTube Channel.

Track listing

References

External links
 

2018 films
Indian supernatural horror films
Bengali remakes of Tamil films
Indian horror film remakes
2018 masala films
Bengali-language Indian films
Bengali-language Bangladeshi films
Indian supernatural thriller films
Indian ghost films
Films directed by Rajiv Kumar Biswas
2010s Bengali-language films
2018 action comedy films
Jaaz Multimedia films